Haicheng is a town in and the county seat of Haiyuan County, in the southwest of Ningxia, China. , it has eight villages under its administration.

References

Haiyuan County
Township-level divisions of Ningxia